Dinocephaloides is a genus of longhorn beetles of the subfamily Lamiinae, containing the following species:

 Dinocephaloides ochreomaculatus Breuning, 1951
 Dinocephaloides variemaculatus Breuning, 1958

References

Tragocephalini
Cerambycidae genera